Idlewild, also spelled Idlewyld, Idyllwild, Idyllwyld, Idylwild, or Idylwyld might refer to:

Film
Idlewild (film), an American musical film released in 2006

Literature
Idlewild (novel), a 2003 novel by Nick Sagan
Idlewild, a 1995 novel by Mark Lawson
Idlewild, the quiet meeting place in Anne of Green Gables

Music
Idlewild (band), Scottish rock band
Idlewild (Everything but the Girl album), 1988
Idlewild (Outkast album), companion album to the 2006 film
"Idlewild Blue (Don'tchu Worry 'Bout Me)", a 2006 song from OutKast's album
Idlewild South, Allman Brothers Band album, 1970
Idlewild Records, a record label
Idlewild (They Might Be Giants album), 2014 compilation
"Idlewild", a song by Travis featuring Josephine Oniyama from their 2016 album Everything at Once
"Idlewild", a song by Gretchen Peters from her 2012 album Hello Cruel World
"Idlewild", a song by Robbie Williams from his 2019 album The Christmas Present

Places

Locations in the United States

Populated places in California
Idlewild, Placer County, California
Idlewild, Tulare County, California
Idyllwild-Pine Cove, California, one of a group of unincorporated communities in Riverside County

Other populated places in the United States
Idlewild Airport, the original name of John F. Kennedy International Airport in New York City
Idlewild, Georgia, a fictional town in the 2006 film Idlewild
Idlewild, Kentucky, an unincorporated community
Idlewild, Michigan, a western Michigan community and former resort, known as "Black Eden" in the early 20th century
Idlewild, Missouri, an unincorporated community
Idlewild, Tennessee, an unincorporated community
Idlewild, Wisconsin, an unincorporated community
Idlewild and Soak Zone, an amusement park in Ligonier Township, Pennsylvania
Ski Idlewild, an abandoned ski area in downtown Winter Park, Colorado
Idylwild Wildlife Management Area in Maryland

Historic sites in the United States
Idlewild (Talladega, Alabama), listed on the NRHP in Talladega County, Alabama
Idlewilde (Indian Springs, Georgia), listed on the NRHP in Butts County, Georgia
Idlewild (Trenton, Kentucky), listed on the NRHP in Todd County, Kentucky
Idlewild (Patterson, Louisiana), listed on the NRHP in St. Mary Parish, Louisiana
Idlewild Historic District (Idlewild, Michigan), listed on the NRHP in Michigan
Idlewild (Port Gibson, Mississippi), listed on the NRHP in Claiborne County, Mississippi
Idlewild, a home in Cornwall-on-Hudson, New York, built by Nathaniel Parker Willis
Dr. Franklin King House-Idlewild, Eden, North Carolina, listed on the NRHP in Rockingham County, North Carolina
Idlewild Farm Complex, Bryn Mawr, Pennsylvania, listed on the NRHP in Pennsylvania
Idlewild (Media, Pennsylvania), summer cottage of architect Frank Furness
Idlewild Historic District (Memphis, Tennessee), listed on the NRHP in Shelby County, Tennessee
Idlewild Mansion (Fredericksburg, VA), Virginia's Landmark Registry
Idlewild (Fredericksburg, Virginia), a historic home located at Fredericksburg, Virginia

Locations in Canada
Idylwylde, Edmonton, a neighborhood in Edmonton, Alberta, Canada
Idylwild Park, a former park in Ontario
Idylwyld Drive, a road in Saskatoon, Saskatchewan

Other uses
Belle of Louisville or Idlewild, a steamboat
Idlewild, a screensaver included with the Windows Entertainment Pack
Idyllwild Arts Foundation in Idyllwild, California
Idyllwild Arts Academy, a private school operated by the Idyllwild Arts Foundation